Apache Geronimo is an open source application server developed by the Apache Software Foundation and distributed under the Apache license.

Geronimo 3, the current version, is compatible with the Java Enterprise Edition (Java EE) 6 specification and therefore supports technologies such as JMS, Enterprise JavaBeans, Connectors, servlets, JSP, JSF, Unified Expression Language and JavaMail. This allows developers to create enterprise applications that are portable and scalable, and that integrate with legacy technologies. The older Geronimo 2 is compatible with Java EE 5.

IBM has in the past provided considerable support to the project through marketing, code contributions, and the funding of several project committers. In October 2005, IBM announced a free edition of its WebSphere application server named Websphere Application Server Community Edition (WASCE), which is actually a distribution of Geronimo and despite its name not related to the commercial WebSphere server. However, IBM has withdrawn marketing and support for WASCE in 2013. Other commercial supporters included AMD, Chariot Solutions, Simula Labs, and Virtuas.

Activity on Apache Geronimo has now largely ceased. Previous prolific Geronimo committers like David Jencks and others who are at IBM are now working on the Liberty Profile application server.

Components 
Like an enterprise operating system, Geronimo is built on a kernel—a microkernel that lays the foundation for everything above it. Geronimo's kernel is Java EE agnostic. Its sole purpose is to manage Geronimo's building blocks. Geronimo is marked by an architectural design that is based on the concept of Inversion of Control (IoC) (sometimes called Dependency Injection), which means that the kernel has no direct dependency on any of its components. The kernel is a framework for services that controls the service life cycle and registry. The kernel is based on Java EE. It works with Java EE services and components to build specific configurations—one of which is a full Java EE solution stack.

A majority of the Geronimo services are added and configured through GBeans to become a part of the overall application server. A GBean is the interface that connects the component to the kernel. Each GBean can maintain state, depend on, and interrelate with other GBeans, and operate on events from the kernel and other GBeans. The GBeans interface makes it possible to switch between two servlet containers, for example Jetty or Tomcat, without affecting the whole architecture using a GBeans interface. This flexible architecture makes it possible for the Geronimo developers to integrate several existing field-tested open source software projects.

Here a list of the open source components that are included in the Geronimo project.

See also 

Other Java EE application servers:
 Apache TomEE
 WildFly (formerly JBoss AS)
 WebSphere AS
 WebLogic Server
 List of application servers
 GlassFish
 Payara Server

References

Bibliography

External links
Apache Geronimo

Geronimo
Java enterprise platform
Free software application servers